Roy Hegreberg (born 25 March 1981 in Norway) is a Norwegian professional road bicycle racer, who competed as a professional between 2004 and 2011. He is the younger brother of Morten Hegreberg.

After his career he became the race director of the Norwegian stage race Tour des Fjords.

Palmarès

2005
1st, Stage 5, Ringerike GP
2010
1st, Stage 1, Tour des Pyrénées

References

External links 
syklingensverden.com

1981 births
Living people
Norwegian male cyclists
Place of birth missing (living people)